The Florida Highway Patrol (FHP) is a division of the Florida Department of Highway Safety and Motor Vehicles. It is Florida's highway patrol and is the primary law enforcement agency charged with investigating traffic crashes and criminal laws on the state's highways.

Duties 
A 2011 study by the Florida Highway Patrol Jurisdiction Team noted that "For all practical purposes, the FHP currently investigates all traffic crashes in the unincorporated areas of 24 counties, and in an additional 26 counties, the majority of crashes. In 17 counties, the Sheriff's Office conducts more crash investigations than the FHP."

The FHP's functional role and responsibilities vary significantly among counties. The 2011 report noted, "The staffing methodology of the FHP is largely based on historical agency decisions, formal and informal arrangements with local governments, and to some degree political influence...There is a disparity in the level of services provided to local governments that cannot be explained. In places like Orange, Escambia, Marion, and many rural counties, the FHP handles all traffic crash investigations in unincorporated areas. In other counties like Duval, Broward, and Palm Beach, the Sheriff handles a majority of traffic crash investigations on the same type of roadways. All other Florida counties fall somewhere among or between these extremes."

FHP has statewide jurisdiction, but shortfalls in FHP staffing sometimes lead to sheriff's offices and city police forces picking up more work, straining resources. Of the annual average long-form traffic crash reports completed by Florida law enforcement agencies, the 2011 study found that FHP investigated 32% of crashes, county sheriff's offices 23%, and municipal police and other agencies 45%. FHP investigates 58% of traffic fatalities in the state; these investigations are substantially more complicated than non-fatal traffic investigations. The Florida Highway Patrol differs from most State Agencies in the Country as it is not considered a State Police. Troopers are however sworn law enforcement officers with Statewide Arrest Powers, but unlike for example the Louisiana State Police, FHP only handles Traffic Enforcement and Traffic Crash Investigation on the State of Florida roadways. In Florida, the constitutional Sheriff is the Chief Law Enforcement Officer. The Florida Department of Law Enforcement, Florida's equivalent to the FBI, handles Criminal Investigations and Officer Records and Training and provides Statewide Crime Lab Services. FHP does have a Bureau of Investigation and Intelligence, but it does not do the same thing FDLE does. Its function is slightly different but works hand in hand with FDLE and other agencies. BCII handles odometer fraud, VIN number fraud, and in some cases Auto Theft Rings.

The Director of the Florida Highway Patrol serves as one of the 19 members of the Florida Criminal Justice Standards & Training Commission.

History

The FHP was established in 1939 under Colonel H. Neil Kirkman. Troopers originally patrolled on motorcycles; among the first patrol cars used by the force was the 1940 Ford De Luxe.

In 1948, Florida received national recognition for its driver license program from the National Safety Council.

In 1994, the FHP, in collaboration with all ten cellular phone companies operating in Florida, launched a "Dial *FHP" program, which allowed the public to make free phone calls to FHP to report highway offenses (such as drunk and reckless driving) as well as motorists in distress. The program became very popular.
 
On July 1, 2011, the Office of Motor Carrier Compliance (a state law enforcement agency responsible for commercial vehicle laws in the state) was transferred from the Florida Department of Transportation to the FHP (which is a division of the Florida Department of Highway Safety and Motor Vehicles). The consolidation was a result of Senate Bill 2160, passed by lawmakers during the 2011 Legislative Session, which gave responsibility for commercial vehicle licensing, registrations, fuel permits, and enforcement to DHSMV.

In 2013, the agency fired a trooper who declined to give speeding tickets to two state legislators who had been pulled over. The trooper won reinstatement after arguing that he was following an unwritten FHP practice of not issuing citations to state legislators, who control the agency's budget.

The FHP has launched a series of anti-aggressive driving campaigns, including "Operation Safe Ride" (2004–2005). FHP also launched the "Statewide Overtime Action Response" (SOAR) program targeting traffic enforcement in areas deemed high priority. An investigation by the Department of Highway Safety and Motor Vehicles' office of inspector general into the SOAR program found that more than a dozen troopers, including several with decades of service had committed misconduct by receiving overtime pay for hours spent not working, among other offenses; some of the troopers were fired, while others were suspended or internally disciplined. The troopers' lawyers argued that their clients had followed a longstanding unwritten FHP rules.

Racial discrimination 
In 2019, the Office of Inspector General conducted a review of Florida Highway Patrol
Troopers and bias based profiling. The results of the review were published January 14, 2020.

A 2021 study in the American Economic Review found that minorities were significantly less likely to receive discounts on their traffic tickets than White drivers; the study estimated that 42% of FHP troopers practiced racial discrimination.

Ranks and organization
The director of the Division of Highway Patrol is the commander of the FHP, and has the rank of Colonel; there are two deputy directors of the Division of Florida Highway Patrol, both hold the rank of Lieutenant Colonel. The FHP is divided into two bureaus: the Bureau of Records and Training (which, among other duties, operates the Florida Highway Patrol Academy in Tallahassee) and the Bureau of Field Operations. The enforcement activity of the Bureau of Field Operations is divided into a Northern Region and a Southern region, each headed by a chief. FHP's Special Services Command and Commercial Vehicle Enforcement are also headed by a chief of equal rank to the regional commanders.

The Northern region consists of Troops A, B, C, G and H, and the Southern region consists of Troops D,F,K,L and E . These troops are assigned responsibility for enforcement activity with specific areas (a cluster of counties). A few troops have statewide or regional responsibilities, including troops charged with weigh station enforcement. Troop K patrols Florida's Turnpike, Troop I covers commercial vehicle enforcement for North Florida, and Troop J covers commercial vehicle enforcement for South Florida. The troop commander of each troop holds the rank of Major.

Promotion of troops to the ranks of Corporal (Trooper II), Sergeant, Lieutenant, and Captain require specific minimum times in service and passage of a promotional examination. Promotion to Corporal requires a written examination; promotion to Sergeant and Lieutenant requires a written examination and assessment, and promotion to Captain requires a written examination and interview.

A career development system was created for troopers through sergeants. This consisted of additional ranks within grade based on years of service and education/training with a plan for financial incentives, however; funding was never approved and the additional ranks are awarded based on recognition of years of service within grade only. Corporal ranks must additionally show proof of case experience before receiving the recognition of an advanced rank.

Trooper
Trooper Specialist- 2 years
Trooper First Class- 7 years
Senior Trooper- 13 years
Master Trooper- 20 years

Corporal
Senior Corporal
Master Corporal

Sergeant
Staff Sergeant - 3 years
Sergeant First Class- 5 years
Master Sergeant- 8 years

Size
As of 2004, the FHP had 1,654 full-time, sworn personnel. This was about 10 full-time troopers for every 100,000 residents, one of the lowest ratios in the country.

The FHP's website stated in 2021 that the agency was authorized for a total of 2,475 full-time employees (1,946 sworn and 529 non-sworn).

Employment demographics 
In 1979, the United States Department of Justice sued the Florida Highway Patrol, alleging race and sex discrimination in employment. The State of Florida entered into a settlement with the Justice Department, which was  incorporated into a consent decree entered by the U.S. District Court for the Northern District of Florida on July 12, 1979. The Consent Decree required the Patrol to hire more minorities and women. In 1985, following a policy change by the Reagan administration, the Justice Department changed its position and required agencies with existing affirmative action consent decrees, including the Florida Highway Patrol, to "end the use of numerical goals and quotas designed to increase employment of women, blacks or Hispanic Americans."

As of 2017, FHP sworn members are 61% white, 14% African American, 23% Hispanic, and 2% other. FHP sworn members are 89% male and 11% female.

Weapons, vehicles, and equipment

Florida law designates the prescribed colors as 'Florida Highway Patrol black and tan.' Florida law makes it a misdemeanor crime to cause a vehicle or motorcycle to be the same or similar colors as prescribed by FHP. A 1998 Legislative review determined the paint added $657 to the purchase of each vehicle. Prior to the vehicles being decommissioned, the Patrol defaces the cars so that they cannot be misconstrued as official law enforcement vehicles. The defaced, two-tone paint reduces each car's resale value by approximately $400.

In 2004, an anonymous Florida resident donated stealthy 18 Mercury Marauders for the FHP's use. In 2017, the FHP deployed a small number of "subdued cruisers" (nicknamed "Ghost Cruisers") for enforcement, assigning one to each of the state's dozen patrol troops.

As of 2007, FHP owned 8 airplanes.

In 2010, FHP adopted the Glock 37 Gen 4 and the subcompact Glock 39 , both in .45 GAP, as the patrol's duty weapon. As of 2021, FHP's primary service weapon is the Glock 45 MOS. The Glock 45 MOS is a compact 9x19mm handgun.

Troop Layout
The Florida Highway Patrol's troops cover the following counties as listed:

Florida Highway Patrol Auxiliary

The Florida Highway Patrol is authorized by Florida law to have an Auxiliary force. The Auxiliary personnel are volunteers who dedicate a minimum number of hours on a part-time, but regularly recurring basis to supplement the Florida Highway Patrol in its legislated duties. The maximum number of auxiliary personnel is limited by law. Auxiliary personnel receive no individual wages, health or insurance benefits, and may not work as auxiliary troopers for compensation (e.g. off duty employment).

Just as with any Florida law enforcement officer, auxiliary personnel who wish to be considered for a traditional Auxiliary trooper position must meet minimum statutory qualification criteria. Additionally, auxiliary members must successfully meet other requirements including submitting a State of Florida application and fingerprints, undergoing a background investigation, passing mandated Florida Department of Law Enforcement (FDLE) and agency law enforcement training requirements. Once certified, Auxiliary troopers are Florida certified auxiliary law enforcement officers. State law provides that while serving under the supervision and direction of a full-time trooper, auxiliary troopers have the power to bear arms and make arrests. The supervision and direction of a full-time trooper may come in the form being present at the scene or in radio contact with the auxiliary trooper. Auxiliary troopers wear agency issued sidearms, and similar but slightly distinctive uniforms.

The Auxiliary is overseen by a high ranking full-time command staff member of the Florida Highway Patrol who acts as the auxiliary coordinator. Throughout the state, each auxiliary unit is supervised by a full-time member who comes under the purview of the troop commander within each troop.

Auxiliary duties include: patrolling the highways of the state, assisting motorists, participating in vehicle equipment and license checkpoints, operating the mobile Breath Alcohol Testing (BAT) Unit, and participating in specialized events or details relevant to traffic related matter.

References

External links

 

Government agencies established in 1939
1939 establishments in Florida
State law enforcement agencies of Florida
State agencies of Florida